Superior Township is a civil township of Chippewa County in the U.S. state of Michigan. The population was 1,337 at the 2010 census.

The federally recognized Bay Mills Indian Community has part of its land base reservation in Superior Township, based west of Brimley. It operates two casinos on its reservation, one of which is in Superior Township, to generate funds for education and welfare of its people.  Brimley State Park is also within the township on the shores of Lake Superior.

Communities
It is situated where the Waiska River flows into Whitefish Bay on Lake Superior. M-221 is a short spur route connecting Brimley with M-28,  to the south. The Bay Mills Indian Community owns land nearby, and Brimley is part of a tax-agreement area with the tribe. The ZIP code is 49715. The community was founded by European Americans in 1887 as Superior; it was renamed in 1896 for a local postal official to avoid confusion with a station in Minnesota on the same railroad line that was also named Superior. Bay Mills Community College, a tribal college, is located in Brimley.
The name comes from the acronym of the Richardson & Avery COmpany.

Geography
Superior Township is located in north of the center of Chippewa County.

The Delirium Wilderness is located several miles south of the community of Raco and extends into Kinross Township to the south.

Demographics
As of the census of 2000, there were 1,329 people, 515 households, and 384 families residing in the township.  The population density was 12.9 per square mile (5.0/km).  There were 759 housing units at an average density of 7.4 per square mile (2.8/km).  The racial makeup of the township was 72.54% White, 0.08% African American, 21.44% Native American, and 5.94% from two or more races. Hispanic or Latino of any race were 0.53% of the population.

There were 515 households, out of which 33.4% had children under the age of 18 living with them, 59.4% were married couples living together, 9.5% had a female householder with no husband present, and 25.4% were non-families. 21.2% of all households were made up of individuals, and 7.8% had someone living alone who was 65 years of age or older.  The average household size was 2.58 and the average family size was 2.96.

In the township the population was spread out, with 27.0% under the age of 18, 7.4% from 18 to 24, 27.0% from 25 to 44, 26.0% from 45 to 64, and 12.6% who were 65 years of age or older.  The median age was 38 years. For every 100 females, there were 104.8 males.  For every 100 females age 18 and over, there were 102.5 males.

The median income for a household in the township was $39,375, and the median income for a family was $43,587. Males had a median income of $35,294 versus $20,038 for females. The per capita income for the township was $17,260.  About 3.0% of families and 5.7% of the population were below the poverty line, including 4.1% of those under age 18 and 7.1% of those age 65 or over.

References

External links
Superior Township

Townships in Chippewa County, Michigan
Townships in Michigan
Michigan populated places on Lake Superior